Tyrvää was a municipality in the Satakunta region, Turku and Pori Province, Finland. It was established in 1439 when the Tyrvää parish was separated from the parish of Karkku. In 1915, the market town of Vammala was separated from Tyrvää, and in 1973, Tyrvää was consolidated with Vammala. In 2009, Vammala became a part of the newly established town Sastamala.

The administrative center of the Tyrvää municipality was located north of Vammala, by the lakes Rautavesi and Liekovesi.

Tyrvää is known as the home of the prominent Finnish painter Akseli Gallen-Kallela, who was raised in Tyrvää, and the site of the medieval St. Olaf's Church.  Finland's first woman writer, Theodolinda Hahnsson was born in Tyrvää. The twin tower Tyrvää Church was built in 1855.

Gallery

References 

Former municipalities of Finland
Sastamala
1439 establishments in Europe
Populated places established in the 1430s
1973 disestablishments in Finland
Populated places disestablished in 1973